Horseleap is a village situated upon the Offaly, Westmeath county border in Ireland, along the R446, formerly the main Dublin to Galway road. The village itself possesses a church, primary school, a garden centre, a pub, and a petrol station. Horseleap dates back to the 12th century and is steeped in Uí Néill, Geoghegan history.

History 

The village's Irish name (Baile Átha an Urchair or Áth an Urchair) was historically anglicised as Ballanurcher, Athnurcher and Ardnurcher. The name probably derives from the legend that Conchobar mac Nessa was killed here.

According to tradition, the English name - Horseleap - originated in an incident in which a member of the De Lacy family was forced to flee on horseback from the Mac Geoghegans. On approaching his castle and discovering that the drawbridge was raised, he jumped the castle's moat on horseback.

The Battle of Ardnocher took place here in 1329 between the forces of Thomas Butler and William Mac Geoghegan. Mac Geoghegan's forces won the battle, and Butler, together with several others of high rank and 140 of his soldiers, was killed.

Transport
The Midland Great Western Railway once maintained a railway station here. Horseleap railway station opened on 1 December 1876, closed to passenger and goods traffic on 27 January 1947 and finally closed altogether on 1 July 1965.

Horse statue

A story concerning a bronze statue of a prancing horse on the village green claims that it was commissioned in Italy by the sports car manufacturer, Ferrari, and eventually wound up in Horseleap following a series of misadventures. Journalist Joe Saward identified the tale as an urban myth, pointing out that Ferrari have denied the story.

See also
 List of towns and villages in Ireland.
 Delvin Castle
 Fore Abbey
 Trim Castle

References

Towns and villages in County Westmeath
Towns and villages in County Offaly